Centerville is a city in Houston County, Georgia, United States. The city is a part of the larger Macon-Warner Robins Combined Statistical Area. It was incorporated March 25, 1958. As of the 2010 census, the city had a population of 7,148, up from 4,278 in 2000. The city's central location, proximity to major highways and interstates, and excellent quality of life makes it one of the top bedroom communities in Georgia. In 2016, Centerville was ranked 7th Happiest City in Georgia by zippia.com, a website devoted to career-related rankings.

Name
Contrary to popular belief, Centerville owes its name not to its geographical position within the state of Georgia, but its position between County seat of Bibb County (Macon) and the county Seat of Houston County (Perry). Historically, it is also located centrally between that of Wellston (today's Warner Robins) and Byron. The earliest Houston County maps show a settlement called Busby, where modern Centerville now stands. Historical documents also show this settlement was called LaVilla, Gunn, Dunbar, and Toy at various times. In 1882, a land map indicated the town as Busbayville. The area map of 1888 shows the community as Centerville, the first known reference to the present name. In 1900, Centerville citizens applied for a local post office, but postal authorities required a different name for the town since there was already a Centerville Post Office located in Gwinnett County. The town name was changed to Hattie in honor of the daughter of Mitchell F. Etheridge, a state representative. When the post office relocated to Byron a few years later, the town of Hattie was changed back to Centerville.

Geography
Centerville is located in northern Houston County at  (32.632111, -83.677950). It is bordered to the east and south by the city of Warner Robins and to the west by the city of Byron in Peach County. U.S. Route 41 passes through the west side of Centerville, leading north  to Macon and south  to Perry, the Houston County seat. State Route 247 Connector (Watson Boulevard) forms the southern edge of Centerville, leading east into Warner Robins and west  to Interstate 75 at Exit 146.

Demographics

2020 census

As of the 2020 United States census, there were 8,228 people, 2,891 households, and 2,122 families residing in the city.

2018
According to American Fact Finder, in 2018, there were 7,776 people and 3,222 housing units in the city.  The median age for residents in the City of Centerville is 37.8 years old. However, Centerville is home to a very active senior population, composing 20% of Centerville's population.  The racial makeup of the city was 65.5% White, 27.6% African American, 0.2% Native American, 3.9% Asian, .04% from other races, and 2.4% from two or more races.

There were 2,863 households, out of which 30.5% had children under the age of 18 living with them, 53.1% were married couples living together, 11.6% had a female householder with no husband present, and 27.3% were non-families. 23.6% of all households were made up of individuals, and 7.2% had someone living alone who was 65 years of age or older.  The average household size was 2.82 persons per household.

In the city, the population was spread out, with 23.3% under the age of 18, 6.9% from 18 to 24, 27.7% from 25 to 44, 22.3% from 45 to 64, and 20.2% who were 65 years of age or older.  The median age was 37.8 years. For every 100 females, there were 83.1 males.

The median income for a household in the city was $53,036. The per capita income for the city was $29,435.  About 5.9% of families and 8.9% of the population were below the poverty line, including 10.8% of those under age 18 and 8.5% of those age 65 or over.

The City has a senior tax exemption law that allows citizens 70 and over to apply for a total tax exemption for their personal home and up to one acre of land, provided their home is located on the land.

Transportation

Major Roadways 
The major roadways in and around Centerville include I-75, GA Highway 247 Connector (Watson Blvd), and GA Highway 41.

Pedestrians 
In 2012, Centerville adopted the sidewalk improvement plan. This plan continues to improve pedestrian walkways in Centerville. In January 2017, the Houston County Commission approved contracts to design two road widening projects. The largest of these two projects was in Centerville, 2 miles of Elberta Road. This project included the addition of a turn lane and sidewalk to this 2-mile stretch. This project was funded by a local 2018 SPLOST.

Airports 
Centerville is 93 miles from Atlanta's Hartsfield-Jackson International Airport. Centerville is 25 miles from the Perry-Houston County Airport. Centerville is 8 miles from the Middle Georgia Regional Airport, which is located in south Macon-Bibb county.

Quality of Life 
The City of Centerville is dedicated to creating an exceptional quality of life for all residents and visitors.

Center Park at Centerville and Town Center at Centerville 
One of the ways Centerville remains dedicated to citizens is through Center Park at Centerville and Town Center at Centerville. Center Park is a community gathering place for residents and visitors alike. Planning for these amenities began in May 2016 by creating a Town Center Master Plan to be implemented over 10 years. The Master Plan is the result of months of public input and community dedication to creating a robust park in the heart of Centerville. The park is currently functioning as a passive park, and there are plans to continue construction and new developments for entertainment and recreational opportunities.

Shopping 
The city is home to the Galleria Mall, the largest mall in the Middle Georgia area, after the Shoppes at Riverside Crossing. There are over 45 stores located within the mall, and its anchor stores include JCPenney and Belk, and formerly had a Sears that closed in April 2018. The mall is connected to the Galleria Mall Stadium Cinemas which is the primary movie theater in the area that shows new and current releases, and recently underwent a renovation. The mall opened in 1994.

Faith Based Organizations 
Another way Centerville is dedicated to creating a great quality of life for residents is by having a large number of faith-based organizations within the City. There are nine Christian churches in Centerville. The Islamic Center of Middle Georgia also residents in Centerville.

Public Libraries 
Centerville is home to a branch of the Houston County Public Library System. The Centerville library used to be a part of the City's Municipal Complex, but in 2015 a new library was built through SPLOST funding.

Government 
The City of Centerville has a weak Mayor-Council form of government, meaning the Mayor's vote counts equal to that of each council person's vote. 
The services that the city government provides include curbside trash pick-up, sewer, and water. Centerville also has a Recycling Center within city limits accepting paper, metals, glass, and other miscellaneous items. The Recycling Center is staffed by volunteers. 
The City has a senior tax exemption law that allows citizens 70 and over to apply for a total tax exemption for their personal home and up to one acre of land, provided their home is located on the land.

References

External links

Cities in Georgia (U.S. state)
Cities in Houston County, Georgia